The Pakistan Democratic Movement, or PDM, is a coalition of political parties in Pakistan. It was founded in September 2020 as a movement against then prime minister Imran Khan, accusing his regime of poor governance, political victimisation of opponents, and mismanaging the economy and foreign policy. The struggle was also joined by several dissident members of Khan's own party, Pakistan Tehreek-e-Insaf (PTI). On 10 April 2022, the coalition succeeded to oust Khan through a no-confidence motion, after which the PDM formed its own government, choosing the opposition leader Shehbaz Sharif as the country's prime minister.

The president of PDM is Fazal-ur-Rehman and the spokesperson is Hafiz Hamdullah, both from Jamiat Ulema-e-Islam (JUIF). Shahid Khaqan Abbasi of the Pakistan Muslim League (PMLN) is the Secretary-General, Mahmood Khan Achakzai of the Pashtunkhwa Milli Awami Party (PMAP) is the Vice President, and Aftab Sherpao of the Qaumi Watan Party (QWP) is the Senior Vice President of the alliance. PDM's former Senior Vice President was Raja Pervaiz Ashraf of the Pakistan Peoples Party (PPP), while the former spokesperson was Mian Iftikhar Hussain of the Awami National Party (ANP).

Background 
The PDM is political movement which was based on the allegations of rigging in the 2018 Pakistani general election, which Imran Khan's Pakistan Tehreek-e-Insaf won. The major agenda of PDM was the narrative that Imran Khan had mismanaged the economy, which resulted in increased inflation in the country, and that the price hike affected the lives of common Pakistanis. PDM leaders claimed that Qamar Javed Bajwa, the Pakistan Army Chief, and Faiz Hameed, head of the intelligence services (ISI), were responsible for "selecting" Imran Khan to office.

However, Imran Khan's government maintained that the movement was motivated by a series of corruption cases against the leaders of the political parties that had previously governed Pakistan, namely the Pakistan Muslim League (PMLN) and the Pakistan Peoples Party (PPP). Moreover, according to Imran Khan, the opposition never appealed to the legal bodies to contest the elections, as his party PTI had in the 2013 general elections. He repeatedly claimed that the opposition was demanding amnesty under the National Reconcialiance Ordinance (NRO), despite the opposition's statements that they did not desire NROs.

Formation 
On 20 September 2020, Bilawal Bhutto Zardari, chairman of the center-left Pakistan Peoples Party, hosted an "all parties conference" at the Islamabad Marriott Hotel to form a grand political alliance and plan strategy for replacing the PTI government. Fazal-ur-Rehman, a harsh critic of military establishment, read out the 26-point resolution adopted by the attendees.

Protests 
On 16 October 2020, PDM held its first political gathering in Gujranwala. Protests organised by the PDM in October 2020 drew over 50,000 people. The government has remained critical and dismissive of the rallies. The PDM planned to hold a "long march" in June 2021, despite objections of large gatherings by health experts, due to the COVID-19 pandemic in Pakistan.

Resignations 

In December 2020, due to disagreements with Fazl-ur-Rehman's leadership, Muhammad Khan Sherani and other senior members of the JUI broke away and formed their own political party called the Jamiat-Ulema-i-Islam Pakistan, claiming that Fazl had personalized the party and used it for his own needs, dismissing the needs of the party itself.

In April 2021, the Pakistan Democratic Movement issued show-cause notices to the Pakistan Peoples Party (PPP) and the Awami National Party (ANP). Later on, the ANP withdrew from the PDM, saying that the movement was "hijacked" by some parties. After a show-cause notice was issued to the PPP, it resigned from the Pakistan Democratic Movement and gave up all offices in the movement along with the ANP.

Coming to power 
The major success of PDM came after reportedly 20 plus members of Pakistan Tehreek-e-Insaf appeared on the surface in Sindh house on 17 March 2022.  Pakistan Tehreek-e-Insaf claimed that these MNAs are bribed and have violated article.  However, PDM refused these claimed and termed decision of dissent members as their own choice. Nevertheless, dissent members allowed PDM to negotiate with government-allied parties Muttahida Qaumi Movement – Pakistan and Balochistan Awami Party proving to them that the government has gone weak and PDM already has a reasonable number to win the no-confidence motion. Ahead of the vote motion  Balochistan Awami Party and Muttahida Qaumi Movement – Pakistan joined the opposition alliance on 29 and 30 March respectively.   As a result of opposition alliance won the vote of no confidence with 174 votes without using dissent members and saving article 63(A) against them. 
 The tenure of Imran Khan as prime minister ended on 9 April 2022, while Shehbaz Sharif was elected as prime minister of Pakistan by the national assembly of Pakistan.

Notable leadership

List of Prime Ministers

List of Chief Ministers

Parties

Parties joining later

Initial parties

Senior leadership

No-confidence motion against Imran Khan 

A vote of no-confidence against Imran Khan was held on 9 April 2022 where 174 members voted against him and removed him as prime minister.  Consequently Shehbaz Sharif was elected as prime minister of Pakistan.

See also 
 2019 Azadi March
 Pakistan National Alliance
 Movement for the Restoration of Democracy
 Lawyers' Movement

References

External links 

Political parties in Pakistan
Political party alliances in Pakistan
Jamiat Ulema-e-Islam (F)
Pakistani democracy movements